Devendra Singh may refer to:

Devendra Singh (1938–2010), American psychologist
Devendra Singh (politician), also known as Bhole Singh (born 1954), Member of the Lok Sabha, the lower house of the Parliament of India, for Akbarpur, Uttar Pradesh (from 2014)
Devendra Pal Singh (born 1975), Indian cricketer
Devendra Pratap Singh, Member of the Legislative Assembly of the Indian state of Uttar Pradesh

See also 
Davendra Singh (born 1950), Fiji Indian politician
Davendra Singh (athlete) (born 1965), Fijian middle-distance runner
Debindro Singh or Devendra Singh (died 1871), King of Manipur (1850)
Devendro Singh (born 1992), Indian boxer